Charles Douglas Laughton (born 13 May 1944) is an English former professional rugby league footballer who played in the 1960s, 1970s and 1980s, and coached in the 1970s, 1980s and 1990s.

Playing career
Laughton was born in Widnes, Lancashire, England, and he played for St. Paul's the Lowerhouse junior team. He then signed as a professional for St. Helens at the age of 18. Laughton made 79 appearances for St. Helens before his transfer to Wigan on 16 May 1967 for £4,000. From there he went to Wigan, before signing for Widnes. Laughton made his first appearance in a Challenge Cup Final in 1970 when Wigan played Castleford. During his Wigan career he was chosen to tour Australia/New Zealand with the Great Britain team coached by Hull Legend Johnny Whiteley. He signed for his home town team Widnes on 6 March 1973 for £6,000.

He led Widnes to victory over the Australian tourists in 1978.

In 1979, he captained Great Britain team on a tour of Australia. In 1979, while playing for Widnes, Laughton won the Man of Steel Award.

Challenge Cup Final appearances
Laughton played  in Widnes' 14–7 victory over Warrington in the 1975 Challenge Cup Final during the 1974–75 season at Wembley Stadium, London on Saturday 10 May 1975, in front of a crowd of 85,998, played  in the 5–20 defeat by St. Helens in the 1976 Challenge Cup Final during the 1975–76 season at Wembley Stadium, London on Saturday 8 May 1976, in front of a crowd of 89,982, played  in the 7–16 defeat by Leeds in the 1977 Challenge Cup Final during the 1976–77 season at Wembley Stadium, London on Saturday 7 May 1977, in front of a crowd of 80,871, and played  in the 12–3 victory over Wakefield Trinity in the 1979 Challenge Cup Final during the 1978–79 season at Wembley Stadium, London on Saturday 5 May 1979, in front of a crowd of 94,218.

County Cup Final appearances
Doug Laughton played  in St. Helens' 12–4 victory over Swinton in the 1964 Lancashire County Cup Final during the 1964–65 season at Central Park, Wigan on Saturday 24 October 1964, played  in Wigan's 15–8 victory over Widnes in the 1971 Lancashire County Cup Final during the 1971–72 season at Knowsley Road, St. Helens on Saturday 28 August 1971, played  in Widnes' 6–2 victory over Salford in the 1974 Lancashire County Cup Final during the 1974–75 season at Central Park, Wigan on Saturday 2 November 1974, played  in the 16–11 victory over Workington Town in the 1976 Lancashire County Cup Final during the 1976–77 season at Central Park, Wigan on Saturday 30 October 1976, and played  and scored 2-tries in the 15–13 victory over Workington Town in the 1978 Lancashire County Cup Final during the 1978–79 season at Central Park, Wigan on Saturday 7 October 1978.

BBC2 Floodlit Trophy Final appearances
Doug Laughton played  in St. Helens' 0-4 defeat by Castleford in the 1965 BBC2 Floodlit Trophy Final during the 1965–66 season at Knowsley Road, St. Helens on Tuesday 14 December 1965, played  in Wigan's 7-4 victory over St. Helens in the 1968 BBC2 Floodlit Trophy Final during the 1968–69 season at Central Park, Wigan on Tuesday 17 December 1968, played  in the 6-11 defeat by Leigh in the 1969 BBC2 Floodlit Trophy Final during the 1969–70 season at Central Park, Wigan on Tuesday 16 December 1969, played  in Widnes' 7-15 defeat by Bramley in the 1973 BBC2 Floodlit Trophy Final during the 1973–74 season at Naughton Park, Widnes on Tuesday 18 December 1973, and played , and was the coach  in Widnes' 13-7 victory St. Helens in the 1978 BBC2 Floodlit Trophy Final during the 1978–79 season at Knowsley Road, St. Helens on Tuesday 12 December 1978.

Player's No.6 Trophy Final appearances
Doug Laughton played  in Widnes' 2-3 defeat by Bradford Northern in the 1974–75 Player's No.6 Trophy Final during the 1974–75 season at Wilderspool Stadium, Warrington on Saturday 25 January 1975, and played  in the 4-9 defeat by Warrington in the 1977–78 Players No.6 Trophy Final during the 1977–78 season at Knowsley Road, St. Helens on Saturday 28 January 1978.

Coaching career
Laughton coached Widnes and Leeds. Doug Laughton took over the job of team coach when Frank Myler retired from the position in 1978. Immediately, he gained from the Widnes players the same respect for his coaching that he still enjoyed for his playing ability. His first acquisition when he became coach was Mick Burke. He had three coaching spells at Widnes between 1978 and 1996. During the 1989–90 Rugby Football League season, he coached defending champions Widnes to their 1989 World Club Challenge victory against the visiting Canberra Raiders. He arrived at Leeds in 1991, and took the club to two successive Challenge Cup Finals, but was beaten by Wigan on both occasions. He surprisingly resigned at the end of the 1994–95 season. Laughton recruited the likes of Martin Offiah, Jonathan Davies, Alan Tait, and John Devereux as his Widnes side conquered England and the world in 1989. During his first season as coach, the club gained four major trophies. More recently, they have been the only team to win three successive Premiership titles, and have become World Club Champions.
Dougie left Leeds after an unexpected allergic reaction. Whilst out for dinner he had his pocket, inexplicably, filled with peas.
Previously undiagnosed,Dougie was allergic to green vegetables, he lost the use of his cone picking up hand and had to seek counselling. A sad end to a great coaching career.

Challenge Cup Final appearances
Doug Laughton was the coach in Widnes 12-3 victory over Wakefield Trinity in the 1979 Challenge Cup Final during the 1978–79 season at Wembley Stadium, London on Saturday 5 May 1979, in front of a crowd of 94,218, was the coach in the 18-9 victory over Hull Kingston Rovers in the 1981 Challenge Cup Final during the 1980–81 season at Wembley Stadium, London on Saturday 2 May 1981, in front of a crowd of 92,496, was the coach in the 14-14 draw with Hull F.C. in the 1982 Challenge Cup Final during the 1981–82 season at Wembley Stadium, London on Saturday 1 May 1982, in front of a crowd of 92,147, and was the coach in the 9-18 defeat by Hull F.C. in the 1982 Challenge Cup Final replay during the 1981–82 season at Elland Road, Leeds on Wednesday 19 May 1982, in front of a crowd of 41,171.

Honours
 1979 Man of Steel Award

Books
 Doug Laughton (2003).A Dream Come True: A Rugby League Life. Publisher:London League Publications Ltd; First edition (31 Oct. 2003)

References

External links
(archived by web.archive.org) Doug Laughton at rlhalloffame.org.uk
Doug Laughton at rugby.widnes.tv
Saints Heritage Society profile
Statistics at rugby.widnes.tv
"CHRISTMAS BOOKS: Laughton's colourful ramble gives taste of brutal" by Dave Hadfield, The Independent (London),  17 Dec 2003
(archived by web.archive.org) Kangaroos beat Lions at Wilderspool

1944 births
Living people
Canterbury-Bankstown Bulldogs players
England national rugby league team players
English rugby league coaches
English rugby league players
Great Britain national rugby league team captains
Great Britain national rugby league team players
Lancashire rugby league team coaches
Leeds Rhinos coaches
Rugby league locks
Rugby league players from Widnes
Rugby league second-rows
St Helens R.F.C. players
Widnes Vikings coaches
Widnes Vikings players
Wigan Warriors captains
Wigan Warriors players